Erika Rosalba Cruz Hernández (born 3 May 1990) is a Mexican professional boxer who has held the WBA female featherweight title since April 2021.

Professional boxing record

References

External links
 

Living people
1990 births
Mexican women boxers
Boxers from Mexico City
World Boxing Association champions
World featherweight boxing champions
Boxers at the 2011 Pan American Games
Pan American Games medalists in boxing
Pan American Games silver medalists for Mexico
Medalists at the 2011 Pan American Games